Robert Gross may refer to:

 Robert A. Gross (historian), American historian
 Robert A. Gross (physicist) (1927–2018), American physicist and engineering scientist
 Robert Arthur Gross (1914–1983), American violinist and composer
 Robert E. Gross (businessman) (1897–1961), businessman in the field of aviation
 Robert Edward Gross (1905–1988), pioneering pediatric cardiothoracic surgeon
 Bob Gross (born 1953), retired professional basketball player